Yaara Dildara is a 1991 Indian Hindi-language romantic drama film directed by Mirza Brothers. It stars Aasif Sheikh and Ruchika Pandey. The movie also marked debut of music directors Jatin–Lalit and is best known for the popular songs "Bin Tere Sanam Mar Mitenge Hum" and "Tum Hi Hamari Ho Manzil, My Love".

Plot
A lonely son of a rich industrialist falls in love with a poor girl but life won't be easy for him without his mother's consent. A local goon is also deeply in love with the same girl.

Cast
 Aasif Sheikh as Rajesh Mehra 
 Ruchika Pandey as Rajni Yadav
 Rohini Hattangadi as Shanti Mehra 
 Saeed Jaffrey as Mr. Mehra
 Shakti Kapoor as Ramaiya
 Kader Khan as Inspector Le Le
 Amjad Khan as Inspector De De
 Ashok Saraf as Mr. Yadav
 Laxmikant Berde
 Viju Khote
 Mohan Choti
 Rajendra Nath

Soundtrack

The music of 'Bin tere Sanam' is not borrowed from 'Young Turks' by Rod Stewart - they sound nowhere similar.

References

External links

1990s Hindi-language films
1991 films
Films scored by Jatin–Lalit